Neiburga is a surname. Notable people with the surname include: 

Andra Neiburga (1957–2019), Latvian writer and translator
Katrīna Neiburga (born 1978), Latvian artist